Jean-Gabriel Périot is a French filmmaker.

Biography 

He lived in Antibes, Nice and Guadeloupe before moving to Paris.

Périot never went to a film school, instead he studied media and communication. While working in the audiovisual service at Centre Georges Pompidou he turned to editing and got introduced to archives.

His favourite filmmaker include: Dziga Vertov, Michael Haneke, Jean-Luc Godard and Guy Debord.

Périot currently shares his time between Paris and Nice.

Filmography

Feature films
Our Defeats (2019)
Summer Lights (2017)
 A German Youth (2015)

Short films 
 Some Joy In This Struggle (2018)
 Song For The Jungle (2018)
 If We Have To Disappear It Will Be Without Disquiet But We Will Fight Until The End (2014)
 WE ARE BECOME DEATH (2014)
 Optimism (2013)
 The Day Has Conquered The Night (2013)
 The Devil (2012)
 Our Days, Absolutely, Have To Be Enlightened (2012)
 Looking At The Dead (2011)
 The Barbarians (2010)
 The Delicate Art Of The Bludgeon (2009)
 Between Dogs And Wolves (2008)
 200000 Phantoms (2007)
 Under Twilight (2006)
 Even If She Had Been A Criminal... (2006)
 Dies Irae (2005)
 Undo (2005)
 We Are Winning, Don't Forget (2004)
 21.04.02 (2002)

References

External links 
 Jean-Gabriel Périot's website
 Jean-Gabriel Périot's vimeo

1974 births
Living people
French documentary filmmakers
French film directors